Fung Seng Enterprises Limited (FSE) is a leading conglomerate in the services industry, employing nearly 13,000 people in Hong Kong .

FSE has three major competencies: facilities management services, electrical & mechanical engineering services and financial services within which several business units specialize, including Property Management, Security Service, Cleaning, Laundry, Landscaping, Electrical & Mechanical Engineering, Trading of Building Materials, and Insurance Consultancy.

NWS Holdings announced on 11 June 2010 that they had entered into an agreement with Fung Seng Enterprises Limited to dispose of certain subsidiary companies engaged in service businesses (NWS Engineering Group Ltd) for a total consideration of HK $888.5 million.

Its head office is in Kowloon Bay.

Business areas
Fung Seng Enterprises Limited (FSE) in three segments:  facilities management services, electrical & mechanical engineering services and financial services. The other business includes the insurance business, project consultancy services, and the sales of building materials and pre-cast structure.

Fung Seng Enterprises Limited (FSE) in five geographical segments: Hong Kong, Mainland China, Macau, Vietnam and Thailand.

Notable Companies in Hong Kong
 Urban Property Management
 Kiu Lok Management Company
 General Security (HK)
 Waihong Environmental Services 
 Hong Kong Island Landscape Company 
 FSE Engineering Group
 Extensive Trading Company
 Nova Insurance Consultants

References

 Milestones about New Holding

External links
 Fung Seng Enterprises Limited (FSE)
 Urban Property ManagementLimited
 General Security(HK) Limited
 Waihong Environmental Services Limited
 Hong Kong Island Landscape Company Limited
 FSE Engineering Group Limited
 Extensive Trading Company Limited
  Nova Insurance Consultants Limited

Conglomerate companies of Hong Kong
Service companies of Hong Kong